General elections were held in Uruguay on 26 November 1922. It was the first time that the presidency had been directly elected, and although Luis Alberto de Herrera of the National Party, received the most votes of any individual candidate, the Colorado Party received most votes overall, and its lead candidate José Serrato was elected president. The Colorado Party factions also won a majority of seats in the Chamber of Deputies.

Results

Aftermath
Following the elections, Serrato was inaugurated as president on 1 March 1923.

References

Elections in Uruguay
Uruguay
General